Sathyanatheswarar Temple (also called Karaivananathar Temple  or Thirukalimedu temple) is a Hindu temple dedicated to Shiva, located in the town of Thirukalimedu, near Indira Theertham Kanchipuram, Kanchipuram district in Tamil Nadu, India. Shiva is worshipped as Sathyanatheswarar and his consort Parvathi as Pramarambikai. Sathyanatheswarar is revered in the 7th-century Tamil Saiva canonical work, the Tevaram, written by Tamil saint poets known as the nayanars and classified as Paadal Petra Sthalam, the 275 temples revered in the canon.

The temple has a three-tiered rajagopuram, the entrance tower and all the shrines are enclosed in a granite wall. The temple has two daily rituals at various times from 5:30 a.m. to 8 p.m., and three yearly festivals on its calendar, namely the Margazhi Tiruvathirai during the Tamil month of Margazhi (December - January), Aipassi Annabishekam during Aippassi (October - November) and Mahashivarathri during February - March being the most prominent. The temple is maintained and administered by the Hindu Religious and Endowment Board of the Government of Tamil Nadu.

Etymology and legend
According to legend, Indra, the king of celestial deities and Bhudan (Mercury) worshipped Shiva at this place located in a forest called Kaaraivanam. Since it was located in Kaaraivanam, the presiding deity came to be known as Karaivananathar (Sathyanatheswarar). Tirugnana Sambandar, a 7th-century Tamil Saivite poet, venerated Sathyanatheswarar in one verse in Tevaram, compiled as the First Tirumurai. As the temple is revered in Tevaram, it is classified as Paadal Petra Sthalam, one of the 275 temples that find mention in the Saiva canon.

As per Hindu legend, Chandra (moon) was under the tutelage of Guru (Jupiter). He wanted to marry Guru's wife, Dhara and did a yagna seeking the boon from Vishnu. Guru attended the function with Dhara, when she was allured by Chandra. Budha was born to Chandra and Dhara. When Budha became an youngster, he came to know about his birth, felt ashamed and started doing a penance praying to Shiva to include him as one of the Navagrahas at this place. Shiva was pleased by his devotion and appeared as Sathyanatheswarar to offer him the boon. As per another legend, Indra, the king of Devas, the celestial deities, was attracted by the beauty of Ahalya, the wife of sage Gautama. He took the form of a rooster to wake the sage early in the day. The sage started his day by going to the river, leaving Ahalya alone in the house. Indra entered the house to attain Ahalya, but the sage sensed something was wrong in the day. He returned to the hermitage and saw Indra escaping as a cat. He cursed Indra to have eyes throughout his body. Indra was roaming around and started doing penance at this place to regain his appearance.

Architecture
The temple is located in the Thirukalimedu locality in Kanchipuram. Sathyanatheswarar temple complex has two prakarams (outer courtyard), a lotus tank and a three-tiered rajagopuram (gateway tower) raising to a height of  facing West. The central shrine faces east and holds the image of Sathyanatheswarar (Shiva) in the form of lingam made of granite and is believed to be a swayambumoorthy (self manifested). As in other temples in Kanchipuram, there is no separate shrine of Parvathi as it is believed that Kamakshi of Kanchipuram is the common Parvathi shrine for all Shiva temples. There is a shrine facing South where the festival image of Pramarambikai is housed. All the rituals performed for the deity is similar to the ones done for the presiding deity. The granite images of Nandi (the bull and vehicle of Shiva), a tall flag staff and a Balipeeta, the place of offering, axial to the sanctum. As in other Shiva temples of Tamil Nadu, the first precinct or the walls around the sanctum of Sathyanatheswarar has images of Dakshinamurthy (Shiva as the Teacher), Durga (warrior-goddess) and Chandikeswarar (a saint and devotee of Shiva). The temple precinct is surrounded by granite walls. Based on the historical significance of the temple, it was in the proposal of Archaeological Survey of India, Chennai Circle, as one of the seven temples to be included as an archaeological monument.

Worship and religious practices
The temple priests perform the puja (rituals) during festivals and on a daily basis. The temple rituals are performed two times a day; Kalasanthi at 8:00 a.m. and Sayarakshai at 6:00 p.m. Each ritual comprises four steps: abhisheka (sacred bath), alangaram (decoration), naivethanam (food offering) and deepa aradanai (waving of lamps) for both Sathyanatheswarar and Pramarambikai Amman. The Margazhi Tiruvathirai during the Tamil month of Margazhi (December - January), Aipassi Annabishekam during Aippassi (October – November) and Mahashivarathri during February and March are the three festivals celebrated in the temple. During Wednesdays, devotees take a holy dip in the temple tank located outside the temple and worship Shiva with green pulse, which is considered a sacred aspect for Budha (Mercury).

References

External links

Padal Petra Stalam
Hindu temples in Kanchipuram